Cemil Gülbaş (born 1980) is a Turkish chess player with the title International Master. He is the 2018 Turkish Chess Champion.

 In June 2004 he participated in the Echternach Open tournament, with 352 players. Gülbas reached a shared 8th place with 7 points out of 9 rounds, one point below the winner, GM Leonid Kritz.
 In December 2007 he became 8th at the "IM Norm Tournament", held in Eupen.
 Gülbaş earned the FIDE title International Master (IM) in 2009. 
 June 2012 he participated, with in total 114 players, at the Klenkes-Cup, in Aachen. He finished at place 27th.
 He won the 2018 Turkish Chess Championship held in Antalya.
 In 2019 he became 5th at the blitz tournament organised by Galatasaray.

References

External links 
 Cemil Gulbas, www.chessgames.com
 Cemil Gulbas, www.365chess.com
 

1980 births
Living people
Turkish chess players